Encyclopedia of Jazz (full title Leonard Feather Encyclopedia of Jazz (in the Sixties) Volume One: The Blues) is an album released on the Verve label compiled by jazz journalist Leonard Feather featuring tracks which were recorded to accompany Feather's Encyclopedia of Jazz in the Sixties . The album features three tracks by the Encyclopedia of Jazz All Stars arranged and conducted by Oliver Nelson along with one track each by Jimmy Smith with Wes Montgomery, Count Basie and Johnny Hodges with Earl Hines.

Reception

The Allmusic site awarded the album 3 stars stating "This diverse LP, which was released in conjunction with Leonard Feather's Encyclopedia of Jazz in the Sixties, is most significant for including three songs by a group led by arranger Oliver Nelson that was called "Leonard Feather's Encyclopedia of Jazz All-Stars"".

Track listing
 "St. Louis Blues" (W. C. Handy) - 6:10
 "I Remember Bird" (Leonard Feather) - 6:25
 "John Brown's Blues" (Traditional) - 3:20
 "OGD" (Wes Montgomery) - 5:15
 "Blues for Eileen" (Eric Dixon) - 5:45
 "C Jam Blues" (Duke Ellington) - 5:05
Recorded in New York City on October 8, 1965 (track 5) and January 14, 1966 (track 6) and at Van Gelder Studio in Englewood Cliffs, NJ on September 28, 1966 (track 4), November 3, 1966 (tracks 1 & 2) and November 4 (track 3).

Personnel
Tracks 1-3:
Oliver Nelson - arranger, conductor
Nat Adderley (track 3), Burt Collins (track 1 & 2), Joe Newman, Ernie Royal, Clark Terry, Joe Wilder, Snooky Young - trumpet, flugelhorn
Jimmy Cleveland, J. J. Johnson - trombone 
Tony Studd - bass trombone 
Bob Brookmeyer - valve trombone 
Jerry Dodgion, Phil Woods - alto saxophone
Jerome Richardson, Zoot Sims - tenor saxophone 
Danny Bank - baritone saxophone 
Al Dailey (tracks 1 & 2), Hank Jones (track 3) - piano
Eric Gale - guitar
Ron Carter - bass
Grady Tate - drum kit
Bobby Rosengarden - percussion
Track 4:
Jimmy Smith - organ
Wes Montgomery - guitar
Grady Tate - drums
Ray Barretto - congas
Track 5:
Count Basie - piano
Al Aarons, Sonny Cohn, Wallace Davenport, Phil Guilbeau - trumpet
Henderson Chambers, Al Grey, Grover Mitchell - trombone
Bill Hughes - bass trombone
Bobby Plater, Marshall Royal - alto saxophone
Eric Dixon - tenor saxophone, flute, arranger
Eddie "Lockjaw" Davis - tenor saxophone
Charles Fowlkes - baritone saxophone
Freddie Green - guitar
Norman Keenan - bass
Rufus Jones - drums
Track 6:
Johnny Hodges - alto saxophone
Earl Hines - piano
Kenny Burrell - guitar
Richard Davis - bass
Joe Marshall - drums

References

1968 albums
Verve Records albums
Oliver Nelson albums
Albums recorded at Van Gelder Studio
Albums produced by Creed Taylor